Étaples-Le Touquet is a railway station serving the towns Étaples and Le Touquet, both in the Pas-de-Calais department, northern France. The station is located in the centre of Étaples.

Services
The station is served by TER Hauts-de-France services between Boulogne and Amiens. It also sees a TGV service to Lille-Europe via Calais-Fréthun.

References

Railway stations in Pas-de-Calais
Railway stations in France opened in 1847
Le Touquet